() is a Japanese retail outlet chain that sells glasses (spectacles). The company is headquartered in Tennōji-ku, Osaka, Osaka Prefecture.

See also

References

External links
 Aigan (Japanese)
 Aigan - Google Finance

Companies based in Osaka Prefecture
Retail companies established in 1961
Eyewear retailers of Japan
Companies listed on the Tokyo Stock Exchange